KWBR (105.7 FM) is a radio station broadcasting a Smooth Jazz music format. Licensed to St. George, Utah, United States, the station is currently owned by Association of Community Resources and News (A.C.O.R.N.). Voted  America's Top Smooth Jazz Radio Station. America's Top Voice Talent on line at www.smoothjazzutah.com

References

External links
 KWBR Smooth Jazz 105.7 Facebook
 

WBR-LP
Radio stations established in 2003
WBR-LP
Smooth jazz radio stations in the United States